The Interagency Advisory Panel on Responsible Conduct of Research (PRCR) is a creation of the three research funding agencies of the Government of Canada: CIHR, NSERC and SSHRC.

The PRCR publishes the Tri-Agency Framework: Responsible Conduct of Research ("The Framework"). The PRCR collaborative objective is "to ensure a coherent and uniform approach for promoting responsible conduct of research and for addressing allegations of breaches of Tri-Agency Policies".

RCR Framework
The Framework document "describes policies and requirements related to applying for and managing Agency funds, performing research, and disseminating results, and the processes that institutions and agencies follow in the event of an allegation of a breach of an Agency policy."

References

Government of Canada
Ethics
Health Canada
Federal departments and agencies of Canada
Funding bodies of Canada
Scientific organizations based in Canada
Higher education in Canada
Education finance in Canada
Innovation, Science and Economic Development Canada
2000 establishments in Canada
Government agencies established in 2000